Bruc-sur-Aff (literally Bruc on Aff; ; Gallo: Bruc) is a commune in the Ille-et-Vilaine department in Brittany in northwestern France.

Population
Inhabitants of Bruc-sur-Aff are called Bruçois in French.

See also
Communes of the Ille-et-Vilaine department

References

External links

  

Mayors of Ille-et-Vilaine Association 

Communes of Ille-et-Vilaine